Barasch is a Jewish Ashkenazi surname, a Hebrew acronymic one בר"ש - from the Hebrew form: Ben Rabbi Sh... (son of Rabbi Shmuel, Shlomo, Shimon or other person whose name begins with 'Sh').
Notable people with the surname include:

George Barasch (1910–2013), American labor leader
Iuliu Barasch, Romanian doctor and public figure
Jack Barasch, known as Jack Barry, television personality
Lynne Barasch
Marc Ian Barasch

See also
Barasch Brothers' Department Store
Barash